In mathematics, the Farrell–Jones conjecture, named after F. Thomas Farrell and Lowell E. Jones, states that certain assembly maps are isomorphisms. These maps are given as certain homomorphisms.

The motivation is the interest in the target of the assembly maps; this may be, for instance, the algebraic K-theory of a group ring

or the L-theory of a group ring

,

where G is some group.

The Baum–Connes conjecture formulates a similar statement, for the topological K-theory of reduced group -algebras .

Formulation

One can find for any ring  equivariant homology theories  satisfying

  respectively 

Here  denotes the group ring.

The K-theoretic Farrell–Jones conjecture for a group G states that the map  induces an isomorphism on homology

Here  denotes the classifying space of the group G with respect to the family of virtually cyclic subgroups, i.e. a G-CW-complex whose isotropy groups are virtually cyclic and for any virtually cyclic subgroup of G the fixed point set is contractible.

The L-theoretic Farrell–Jones conjecture is analogous.

Computational aspects 
The computation of the algebraic K-groups and the L-groups of a group ring  is motivated by obstructions living in those groups (see for example Wall's finiteness obstruction, surgery obstruction, Whitehead torsion). So suppose a group  satisfies the Farrell–Jones conjecture for algebraic K-theory. Suppose furthermore we have already found a model  for the classifying space for virtually cyclic subgroups:

 

Choose -pushouts and apply the Mayer-Vietoris sequence to them:

 

This sequence simplifies to:

 

Why the family of virtually cyclic subgroups ? 
One might also try to take for example the family of finite subgroups into account. This family is much easier to handle. Consider the infinite cyclic group . Using the properties of equivariant K-theory we get

 

The Bass-Heller-Swan decomposition gives

 

Indeed one checks that the assembly map is given by the canonical inclusion.

 

So it is an isomorphism if and only if , which is the case if  is a regular ring. So in this case one can really use the family of finite subgroups. On the other hand this shows that the isomorphism conjecture for algebraic K-Theory and the family of finite subgroups is not true. One has to extend the conjecture to a larger family of subgroups which contains all the counterexamples. Currently no counterexamples for the Farrell–Jones conjecture are known. If there is a counterexample, one has to enlarge the family of subgroups to a larger family which contains that counterexample.

Inheritances of isomorphism conjectures 
The class of groups which satisfies the fibered Farrell–Jones conjecture contain the following groups

 virtually cyclic groups (definition)
 hyperbolic groups (see )
 CAT(0)-groups (see )
 solvable groups (see )
 mapping class groups (see )

Furthermore the class has the following inheritance properties:

 Closed under finite products of groups.
 Closed under taking subgroups.

Meta-conjecture and fibered isomorphism conjectures 

Fix an equivariant homology theory . One could say, that a group  G satisfies the isomorphism conjecture for a family of subgroups, if and only if the map induced by the projection  induces an isomorphism on homology:

 

The group G satisfies the fibered isomorphism conjecture for the family of subgroups F if and only if for any group homomorphism  the group H satisfies the isomorphism conjecture for the family

 .

One gets immediately that in this situation  also satisfies the fibered isomorphism conjecture for the family .

Transitivity principle

The transitivity principle is a tool to change the family of subgroups to consider. Suppose every group  satisfies the (fibered) isomorphism conjecture with respect to the family .
Then the group  satisfies the fibered isomorphism conjecture with respect to the family  if and only if it satisfies the (fibered) isomorphism conjecture with respect to the family .

Isomorphism conjectures and group homomorphisms

Given any group homomorphism  and suppose that G"' satisfies the fibered isomorphism conjecture for a family F of subgroups. Then also H"' satisfies the fibered isomorphism conjecture for the family . For example if  has finite kernel the family  agrees with the family of virtually cyclic subgroups of H.

For suitable  one can use the transitivity principle to reduce the family again.

Connections to other conjectures

Novikov conjecture 

There are also connections from the Farrell–Jones conjecture to the Novikov conjecture. It is known that if one of the following maps

 

 

See for example,.

Bost conjecture 

The Bost conjecture (named for Jean-Benoît Bost) states that the assembly map

is an isomorphism. The ring homomorphism  induces maps in K-theory . Composing the upper assembly map with this homomorphism one gets exactly the assembly map occurring in the Baum–Connes conjecture.

Kaplansky conjecture 

There are theorems relating the Kaplansky conjecture to the Farrell Williams–Jones conjecture (compare ).

References

Surgery theory
K-theory
Conjectures
Unsolved problems in mathematics